Jim O'Brien (born February 7, 1947) is a former American football placekicker in the National Football League. He played for the Baltimore Colts from 1970 to 1972 and the Detroit Lions in 1973.  He also played wide receiver, catching the bulk of his career passes during the 1972 season while still performing his kicking duties. O'Brien is best remembered for kicking a game-winning field goal in the waning seconds of Super Bowl V, making him the first of only three placekickers to accomplish such a feat.

Career
O'Brien attended the University of Cincinnati, where he led the nation in scoring as a football senior.  He also played basketball for the Bearcats. O'Brien graduated from Aiken High School in Cincinnati and had an appointment to the U.S. Air Force Academy, but received a medical discharge for an ulcer.

O'Brien, nicknamed "Lassie" by his teammates, had an auspicious start with his rookie season, making 19 of 34 field goals while having a peak of 48 yards for longest kick. O'Brien would prove to have a crucial part within mixed success in the postseason. In the Colts' run to Super Bowl V, O'Brien made 3 of 7 field goals while being perfect on all five extra points leading up to the final game against the Dallas Cowboys. It was O'Brien that played a part in setting the stage for the first big kick of the Super Bowl, as he had made just one of his two extra points (the missed one had been blocked) that meant the score was 13-13 late in the fourth quarter. A Mike Curtis interception brought the ball to the 28 yard-line, and on third down with seven yards to go, O'Brien was sent to kick a field goal. Before kicking the field goal, teammates saw that O'Brien was so nervous, he tried to take some of the artificial turf off the field to figure out the wind, thinking the field was regular grass. With nine seconds remaining, his kick sailed through the uprights to make the first Super Bowl to be decided in the fourth quarter. For twenty years, it would be the only Super Bowl to be decided on a field goal (Super Bowl XXV however was the first to have the field goal be the true last play of the game, as V ended on a failed long pass attempt). Because of his singular moment kicking the Super Bowl-winning field goal, NFL Films named him the #9 "One-Hit Wonder" of all time. In the NFL Films video, his former Colt teammates amusedly related that they saw "Lassie" as a hippie due to his long hair (Bubba Smith clarified that O'Brien wasn't actually a hippie type in any way except for his hair) and that they planned to forcibly shear his long locks after the Super Bowl, but after he made the championship-winning kick Bill Curry got the veterans to agree that O'Brien deserved to keep his hair just as it was. Curry told a visibly relieved O'Brien he was both a world champion and would not get an involuntary crew cut.

The next season, O'Brien kicked 20 out of 29 field goals successfully while having a peak of 50 yards on one kick. He missed just one extra point during the season. He regressed wildly in 1972, having gone 13 of 31 while having a peak of just 42 yards on his kicks. He also caught 11 passes for 263 yards for two touchdowns during the season, which proved to be his last in Baltimore. He rejected the Colts' suggestion that he focus on being a wide receiver in 1972, and was traded to Detroit for a draft pick before the 1972 season.  He made 8 of 14 field goals with a peak of 39 yards while making every extra point. In 1974, O'Brien was hit in the face with a beer bottle while at a bar and required surgery for a cut cornea. He cited this as likely a big reason for him not latching on to a team after that incident.

Ultimately, O'Brien posted a 55.6 percentage with 60 of 108 field goal attempts made.

Personal life
Since retirement, O'Brien has worked in project management for construction in Thousand Oaks, California.

See also
 List of NCAA major college football yearly scoring leaders

References

External links
 NFL.com player page

1947 births
Living people
American football placekickers
American football wide receivers
Baltimore Colts players
Cincinnati Bearcats football players
Detroit Lions players
Players of American football from El Paso, Texas